Hanne Stine Nabintu Herland (born 1966 in Kivu, Congo) is a Norwegian author, who hosts a website and Youtube channel both named the Herland Report. She has a master's degree in history of religions from the University of Oslo.

Herland identifies with social conservatism and states that she opposes political correctness. Among Herland's books are Alarm! Tanker om en kultur i krise (2010), Respekt (2012), The Culture War. How the West lost its greatness (2017), Det nye Babylon (2018) and New Left Tyranny. The Authoritarian destruction of our way of life (2020). She was editor of Ny vind over Norge. Herland has appeared as a pundit on Russia Today, criticizing alleged Western hypocrisy. Her writings have been recommended by the Russian embassy in Norway. Regular guests on the Herland Report include US Republicans as Senator Richard Black, Senator Ron Paul.

Early life
Herland was born in the Democratic Republic of Congo. Her parents moved to Africa in the 1960s to work for UNESCO. Her middle name Nabintu is African. She spent her childhood in the Congo, Kenya and Rwanda. At the age of 19 she moved to Norway.  Herland obtained an MA in the history of religions at the University of Oslo in 2005, writing her master's thesis on the Kenyan Qadi court.

Public debate 
Herland has been an active and controversial public commentator and writer in Norway since the mid 2000s, voicing opposition against feminism, "globalism," and what she claims is a "liberal breaking up of traditional values." 

In 2007, she wrote the op-ed "Western women's defeat," in which she wrote that it is not strange that Africans rape women when they come to Norway and experience how worthless a woman's sexuality is in Western culture, where women are sexual objects according to Herland. Herland concludes: "In a country that is increasingly characterized by a deterioration of traditional values, the woman sits drunk and alone in bars at night in miniskirts – and thinks she's free."

In the 2007 op-ed "Rasismen mot hvite," Herland claimed that the predominant form of racism in today's Norway is "the racism against white people." In 2009, she criticized feminism and said it had created many harsh Norwegian women, and that she understood men who preferred Russian and Thai brides.

In 2010 the Christian organisation Digni removed a presention by Herland from their website after facing criticism. A remix of the presentation, titled "Skal vi danse, Nabintu?", went viral in Norway.

In 2011, Herland claimed that Norway is the West's most anti-semitic country, as even the state level is involved in a gross bias against Middle Eastern opinions. She said that anti-Israelism is the new face of anti-Semitism in Europe. She has for long addressed the problems of Middle Eastern Christians.

Since the outbreak of The Arab Spring, Herland has warned extensively against the Western naive belief that the Arab Spring would lead to Western democracy in the Middle East. She has said the Arab Spring could become an Arab Winter. In March, 2011, she held a speech at the Oslo Symposium conference organised by various Christian right organisations, warning that chaos might be the result in Egypt after the fall of Hosni Mubarak. 
She has been sharply critical of US' involvement in the Middle East.

In 2014, she was featured by RT in Worlds Apart. The Russian embassy in Norway has recommended Herland's blog as a source of information about Russia.

In 2018 Herland interviewed alt-right figure Milo Yiannopolous. She has also interviewed among others Bishop Harry Jackson, Dr. Paul Craig Roberts,  Dr. Ron Paul, Kirbyjon Caldwell, Mohammad Usman Rana and Reginald Davis.

In 2015 she produced a series called Jerusalem for the conservative Christian niche channel TV Visjon Norge, about conservative Israelis' view on the region. It was described by Dagbladet as giving a voice to the extreme right in Israel while not interviewing any Palestinians or moderate Israelis. The TV Series Jerusalem also aired at CBN in USA.

The Norwegian Centre Against Racism wrote in a report on far-right extremism that Herland has expressed support for the Norwegian Defence League. Herland has repeatedly stressed in TV interviews, on her website  and in the media, that she supports muslims in Norway and stresses the need for religious freedom for all.

Books
As a contributor to the book Ny sjanse (English: New chance), published in 2006 by the Conservative Party with 
Per Kristian Foss as editor, Herland argued that the Norwegian welfare state discouraged immigrants to seek work and made many too dependent on welfare benefits.

Herland's book Alarm! Reflections on a culture in crisis was published in 2010. In the book, she criticized what she called "the leftist radicals" and argued that Europeans are about to commit cultural suicide. Her work was called a fresh contribution to Christian conservative thought by Knut Hoem. The book was criticized as a poorly written collection of extended op-eds with many factual errors by liberal critic Øyvind Strømmen.

In the autobiography Respect, published in 2012, Herland discusses what she claims is "the socialist racism against whites and denigrating view of non-Western immigrants," Norwegian mediocrity and lack of respect for traditional Norwegian culture and on an international level, the lack of respect for sovereign states. She claims that "criminal immigrants" are "uncivilized" and focus on the importance of supporting law abiding immigrants. The last part of the book discusses The Arab Spring and the Libya war. She claims Norway is in a state of "civil war" since the generation of 1968 "destroyed" culture and society, and that Norwegians are currently living in a "constant state of war." She also writes about her cultural shock upon moving to Norway as an adult after growing up in Africa. The book was described by debate editor in Aftenposten Knut Olav Åmås as "a shockingly bad debate book" and its style as "characterizing and generalizing more than argumentative, often with thin or no supporting evidence." Dagbladet commentator Inger Merete Hobbelstad criticized the extent of the media coverage of Herland and the quality of Herland's contributions to public discourse, noting that "the arguments in her op-ed articles are weak, characterized by a striking absence of documentation and examples". Conservative magazine Minerva described the book as "disappointingly bad" and full of factual errors.

In 2013, Herland was editor of the political debate book Ny vind over Norge (English: New wind in Norway) which had 15 contributors including Erna Solberg, Siv Jensen, Torbjørn Røe Isaksen, Lars Roar Langslet, Asle Toje and Walid al-Kubaisi. The book was published in June, prior to the Norwegian parliamentary election in September 2013. Aftenposten editor Knut Olav Åmås called the book "Fresh new thoughts from the Right that sum up the ideological debate the past years." Dagbladet critic Jon Berglien described the book as "at the very best a gentle breeze" and argued that the book was "full of empty slogans" and that "some voices wondered about which company the different participants were in."
 
She wrote the foreword in the Norwegian painter Odd Nedrum's 2013 book Crime and Refuge.

Bibliography 
 Kristiansen, Hanne Stine Nabintu; Lys over landsbyen, Filadelfiaforlaget (1980) 
 Kristiansen, Hanne Stine Nabintu; Det siste våpenet – Tenår-ringen, Filadelfiaforlaget (1985) 
 Herland, Hanne Stine Nabintu: The task of reviving islam: Qadi-domstolens betydning for islamiseringen i Kenya Universitetet i Oslo (2005)
 Herland, Hanne Stine Nabintu; Alarm! Tanker om en kultur i krise, Luther forlag (2010) 
 Herland, Hanne Nabintu; Respekt. Orfeus publishing (2012). 
 Herland, Hanne Stine Nabintu (editor); Ny vind over Norge, Dreyers Forlag (2013) 
 Herland, Hanne Nabintu; THE CULTURE WAR: How the West Lost Its Greatness & Was Weakened From Within . Christian Publishing House (2017).  
 Herland, Hanne Nabintu; Det nye Babylon - hvordan vesten mistet sin storhet. Ventura Forlag (2018). 
 Herland, Hanne Nabintu; Nature's paradise of Smola, Norway. Partner Forlag. (2019)  
 Herland, Hanne Nabintu; New Left Tyranny. The Authoritarian Destruction of our Way of Life.

References

External links 
 Hanne Nabintu Herland´s blog
 Hanne Nabintu Herland's YouTube Channel

1966 births
People from Maniema
Norwegian non-fiction writers
Norwegian women non-fiction writers
Norwegian essayists
Norwegian Christians
Norwegian YouTubers
Living people
Republic of the Congo people of Norwegian descent
Norwegian people of Republic of the Congo descent